Receptor activity modifying protein 3, also known as RAMP3, is a human gene.

The protein encoded by this gene is a member of the RAMP family of single-transmembrane-domain proteins, called receptor (calcitonin) activity modifying proteins (RAMPs). RAMPs are type I transmembrane proteins with an extracellular N terminus and a cytoplasmic C terminus. RAMPs are required to transport calcitonin-receptor-like receptor (CRLR) to the plasma membrane. CRLR, a receptor with seven transmembrane domains, can function as either a calcitonin gene-related peptide (CGRP) receptor or an adrenomedullin receptor, depending on which members of the RAMP family are expressed. In humans and other mammals, there are 3 RAMPS, while in fish there are more, with sub-variants. In the presence of this (RAMP3) protein, CRLR functions as an adrenomedullin receptor with low affinity for CGRP.

References

Further reading

External links